Drskovče is a village south of Pivka in the Inner Carniola region of Slovenia.

The small church in the settlement is dedicated to Our Lady of Sorrows and belongs to the Parish of Zagorje.

References

External links

Drskovče on Geopedia
Drskovče Local Community site

Populated places in the Municipality of Pivka